Sebastian de Oliveira (born 8 June 2001) is a South African cricketer. He made his List A debut on 19 January 2020, for Gauteng in the 2019–20 CSA Provincial One-Day Challenge.

References

External links
 

2001 births
Living people
South African cricketers
Gauteng cricketers
Place of birth missing (living people)